William D. McHenry (born June 20, 1932) is a former American football and lacrosse player and coach and college athletics administrator. An accomplished athlete at Washington and Lee University in Lexington, Virginia, McHenry was chosen by the Washington Redskins in the sixth round of the 1954 NFL Draft.  He also played lacrosse at Washington and Lee.  McHenry served as the head coach at Lebanon Valley College in Pennsylvania from 1961 to 1970 before returning to his alma mater in 1973 where remained for five seasons, compiling a career college football coaching record of 56–70–3. In 1958, McHenry was hired as the head lacrosse coach at Williams College, where he also worked as an assistant football coach. McHenry finished his career in athletics by serving as the athletic director at the College of Wooster from 1991 until his retirement in 1996.

Head coaching record

Football

References

1932 births
Living people
American football centers
Lebanon Valley Flying Dutchmen football coaches
Washington and Lee Generals athletic directors
Washington and Lee Generals football coaches
Washington and Lee Generals football players
Washington and Lee Generals men's lacrosse players
Widener Pride football coaches
Wooster Fighting Scots athletic directors
Williams Ephs football coaches
Williams Ephs men's lacrosse coaches
College swimming coaches in the United States